St Peter's Abbey in the Black Forest or St. Peter's Abbey, Schwarzwald is a former Benedictine monastery in the village of St. Peter im Schwarzwald, in the district of Breisgau-Hochschwarzwald, Baden-Württemberg, Germany.

History
The monastic community of St. Peter's was the house monastery and burial place of the Zähringen family. It was founded in Weilheim, in or before 1073, but was forced by hostile military action during the Investiture Controversy to move to Hirsau. Duke Berthold II of Zähringen (1078–1111) re-founded it as a family monastery, but decided in about 1090 to move it to the site which is now St. Peter im Schwarzwald.

Here it soon developed as a reformed Benedictine monastery directly answerable to the papacy, as witness for example the privilege of Pope Urban II of 10 March 1095. The Vögte (lords protectors) were initially the Zähringen family but, in the late 13th century, they were succeeded by the Counts of Urach, against whom the monks were eventually obliged to seek the protection of Emperor Charles IV. In 1526 the office passed to the Habsburgs.

By the gift of the Zähringen family and their ministeriales the abbey acquired substantial property, particularly in the 11th and 12th centuries, located in the immediate area, in the Breisgau and in the Baar region, near Weilheim. The abbey, like most other landowners of the time, suffered significant loss of income and tenants after the middle of the 14th century.

The abbey suffered disastrous fires in 1238 and again in 1437. It lost importance in the later mediaeval period, and the monastic reforms of the 15th century had little effect here. Nevertheless, it managed to keep its property intact, even through the troubles of the Reformation. The premises were re-built in Baroque style in the 17th and 18th centuries; the present church with the two onion towers ("Zwiebeltürme") was built in the 1720s. The architect was Peter Thumb, and the opulent Baroque decoration was by Franz Joseph Spiegler (55 frescoes, 1727) and Joseph Anton Feuchtmayer (sculptures), among other artists and craftsmen. Peter Thumb also constructed the library. The abbey was dissolved in the secularisation of 1806.

Abbots to 1544

 Adalbero (1093–1100)
 Hugo I (1100–08)
 Eppo (1108–32)
 Gozmann (1132–37)
 Markward (1154–83)
 Rudolf of Reutenhalden (1183–91)
 Berthold I (1191–1220)
 Heinrich I (1220–55)
 Arnold (1255–75)
 Walther I (1275–91)
 Eberhard (1291–95)
 Gottfried of Lötschibach (1295–1322)
 Berthold II (1322–49)
 Walther II (1350–53)
 Johannes I of Immendingen (1353–57)
 Peter I of Thannheim (1357–66)
 Jakob I Stahelin (1367–80)
 Hugo II (1380–82)
 Heinrich II of Stein (1382–90)
 Heinrich III Salatin (1390–92)
 Johannes II of Stein (1392)
 Erhard (1392–1401)
 Benedikt I of Thannheim (1401–02)
 Johannes III (1402–04)
 Johannes IV Kanzler (1404–09)
 Heinrich IV von Oettlingen (1409–14)
 Heinrich V von Hornberg (1414–27)
 Johannes V Tüffer (1427–39)
 Jakob II von Altensummerau (1439–43)
 Konrad von Hofen (1443–49)
 Burkhard von Mansberg (1449–53)
 Johannes VI von Küssenberg (1453–69)
 Peter II Emhardt (1469–92)
 Simon Budner (1492–96)
 Peter III Gremmelsbach (1496–1512)
 Jodocus Kaiser (1512–31)
 Adam Guldin (1531–44)

Abbots of the Early Modern period include:
 Philipp Jakob Steyrer (1749–95)
 Ignaz Speckle (1795–1806)

Burials
Conrad I, Duke of Zähringen
Agnes of Rheinfelden
Berthold II, Duke of Swabia

References
 Buhlmann, M., 2004. Benediktinisches Mönchtum im mittelalterlichen Schwarzwald. Ein Lexikon. Vortrag beim Schwarzwaldverein St. Georgen e.V., St. Georgen im Schwarzwald, 10. November 2004, Teil 2: N-Z (= Vertex Alemanniae, H.10/2), pp82ff. St. Georgen.

External links
  Bibliography, University of Freiburg Library
  St. Peter: History and images 
  Short history by the town of St. Peter
  Detailed student research paper about the frescoes depicting scenes from the life of St. Peter

Benedictine monasteries in Germany
Monasteries in Baden-Württemberg
Christian monasteries established in the 11th century
Religious organizations established in the 1070s
11th-century establishments in the Holy Roman Empire
1806 disestablishments in the Holy Roman Empire
Buildings and structures in Breisgau-Hochschwarzwald
Burial sites of the House of Zähringen
Imperial abbeys